Dust (real name Sooraya Qadir) is a superheroine appearing in American comic books published by Marvel Comics. The character usually appears in X-Men-related comic books. Sooraya is a mutant with the ability to transform her body into a pliable cloud of dust. The X-Men travel to Afghanistan to rescue Sooraya, whose abilities have made her the target of antagonists.

Publication history
Dust was created by author Grant Morrison and artist Ethan Van Sciver in New X-Men #133 (December 2002), although her character was not fully developed until the New X-Men: Academy X series written by Christina Weir and Nunzio DeFilippis.

Born in Kandahar, Sooraya is attacked by a slave trader attempting to remove her traditional niqāb; almost instinctively, she lashes out with her powers and flays him alive with her sand-like dust. The X-Men, hearing of the situation, travel to Afghanistan and rescue her, where she is brought to the United States and becomes a student of the Xavier Institute for Higher Learning. After the actions of the Scarlet Witch (in which millions of mutants lost their powers), Sooraya remains one of the few mutants to keep their powers. She is currently a member of the Champions team.

Fictional character biography

Origin
Dust is a Sunni Muslim girl, and an ethnic Pashtun who possesses the mutant power to turn herself into a sand-like substance. Native to Kandahar, Afghanistan, Sooraya is kidnapped by a slave-trading ring after she is separated from her mother. While one of her slavers tries to remove her niqāb, she instinctively lashes out with her powers and flays them all alive with her dust form before passing out.  She is subsequently discovered and rescued by Wolverine and Fantomex. Wolverine takes her to the X-Corporation branch office. Sooraya hides herself from the X-Men stationed there by turning into sand and spreading herself around the complex. Phoenix senses Sooraya's presence and telepathically convinces her to reveal herself to everyone present. Sooraya reforms and announces her presence by speaking a single word: Turaab (Arabic for dust/sand).

Xavier Institute
Ultimately, Dust is enrolled at the Xavier Institute in Westchester County, New York. Sooraya is initially placed into Xorn's Special Class and is picked on by Xorn for standing by her faith and allegedly placing its importance over the cause of mutants.  Frightened, she then alerts Professor X to Xorn's 'true' identity.  She attempts to use her powers to do so, but Xorn manages to defeat her and Xavier. Quiet and nervous, she experiences difficulty adapting to her new surroundings - particularly after being given the loud and rebellious Noriko as a roommate. Sooraya and Noriko often come to disagreements over the traditional garb which Noriko believes to be an affront to women's rights.

Hellions Squad
After the conclusion of New X-Men where leadership of the school goes to Emma Frost and Cyclops, Sooraya is made a member of the Hellions training squad.  She opts to observe Islamic hijab rather than wear a standard training costume, though it does bear the standard 'X' insignia.  She forges a friendship with Icarus. He asks her to the school dance, but she declines since the idea of the dance made her uncomfortable, though she did not feel insulted by his asking, nor did Icarus feel insulted due to her rejection.

After winning the field day competition with the rest of the Hellions and the academic year ended, Hellion (Julian Keller) had invited the Hellion Squad to his home in Los Angeles for summer vacation. While there, the Hellion Squad meets the Kingmaker, a powerful criminal with the power to make "dreams come true" through favors and connections, but for whom favors are expected in return. When each of the Hellions agree to the deal, Sooraya's wish was to find her mother. The Kingmaker finds Sooraya's mother and arranges for a trip back to Afghanistan so that Sooraya can meet up with her. She is soon flown back to L.A. to deliver on her part of the deal; stealing an advanced bio-weapon, which they learn later will be sold to Doctor Octopus in New York. The Hellion Squad breaks their deal with the Kingmaker and end up destroying the weapon. As a result, Sooraya loses her connection to her mother as she learns she has been moved again with no hope of tracking her, leaving her devastated.

Decimation

After House of M, Wanda Maximoff depowered over 90% of the mutant population, thereby reducing the population of Xavier's student body to only 27 students (including Dust). The squad system has been dissolved, and the remaining students have been merged into one large group. She is also paired as roommates with X-23.

Sooraya becomes a target of William Stryker's crusade against the Xavier Institute, as he expresses his need to "eliminate the Muslim". Icarus gives her a note, which X-23 tells Sooraya not to trust, as Icarus "smells like death". In reality, Stryker wishes to eliminate her because Nimrod has a vision of an altered future in its memory banks which shows Dust defeating all the Purifiers during their planned future attack on the school. Wallflower was previously killed by the Purifiers because of Nimrod's portrayal of her ability to turn the tide of the fight with her pheromones. Upon entering the church of Reverend Stryker, she is shown being shot down, though it is later revealed to be X-23 wearing one of Sooraya's niqābs. Learning the Purifier's true intentions and that he was tricked into leading "Sooraya" to her death, Icarus is killed by Stryker. When Stryker's team infiltrates the school, Dust awakens in the bathroom, having been knocked out by X-23. She enters the fight and surprises Stryker, singlehandedly defeating most of his Purifiers and severely wounding Stryker's follower, Matthew Risman.

She, with the help of the rest of the New X-Men, later defeat Nimrod, Stryker's backup plan for destroying the mutants.

The Institute holds a memorial for the mutants lost during M-Day; Sooraya cries with Icarus' mother when she comes to the Institute and apologizes for not being able to do more to save her son. His mother tells her that Icarus thought she was a beautiful person.

Mercury Falling
While Hellion and X-23 go off to rescue Mercury from the Facility, Sooraya is left at the mansion but learns vital information from Pixie of what happened. Sooraya immediately tells Nori and David Alleyne what she knows; Dust and the remaining team are about to leave the institute, but are stopped by Shadowcat, who brings them in for the time being to tell them about the whereabouts of their teammates and friends.

The "Astonishing" team and the remaining X-Men, accompanied by the O*N*E* Sentinel, go off to the Facility and rescue Hellion, X-23, and Mercury.

Quest for Magik
Dust is shown praying to God before being teleported with the other students to Limbo where she is held captive by Belasco and his demons. X-23 breaks free and urges Dust and Mercury to join her in fighting Belasco.  Dust is too afraid of Belasco, believing him to be the Devil, but when X-23 is seemingly killed, Dust breaks free and attacks Belasco, saying that if she is to die in battle against "the Devil", she would make Allah proud. Dust and Mercury fight with Belasco and manage to hold their own due to the fact that their transient forms give them limited resistance to Belasco's magic. When Surge and Hellion arrive, the two girls are exhausted and can only watch as Belasco tries to pull Earth into Limbo. He fends off every student of the Xavier Institute until he is slain by Pixie and the Darkchild.

World War Hulk

Dust is part of the New X-Men in a training session supervised by Beast that goes up against the Hulk when he comes to the mansion. She attacks him in her sand form after he defeats Hellion, but she too is defeated when Hulk pulls a water pipe up from the ground and sprays water at her, taking her out of the fight.

She is also quizzed by Pixie about her beliefs and choice of dress and has her shoulder fixed by Beast after it is dislocated during the fight with Belasco. She also checks on Julian at the urging of Mercury, after Nori kisses him.

Messiah Complex

Regrouping after their failed attack under the leadership of Matthew Risman, the Purifiers are keeping track of the escaped Predator X. Horribly scarred by Dust's attack, Matthew is fixated on training Predator X to seek out and kill Sooraya by using abayas and niqabs bearing some recognizable quality of hers (possibly her scent). While being trained to seek out and kill Dust, Predator X senses the mutant it was originally created to destroy (the unknown mutant featured in X-Men: Messiah Complex) and the Purifiers follow. Sooraya neglects to join her teammates in raiding the Purifier's most important base in D.C. merely because she thinks that her squad leader, Surge, is out for vengeance and that she is only ambushing the Purifiers for the baby as an afterthought. She stays at the mansion alongside Elixir and David and the remainder of the student body while the other New X-Men and the X-Man, Armor, leave.

Later, the mansion's Megatron Sentinel guard are taken over completely by nanosentinel technology, causing them to battle the X-Men. As Hepzibah, Warpath, Bishop, and the student Nezhno fight the Sentinels, Dust appears and Cyclops orders her to enter the Sentinels to find out what is going on and stop it if she can. She does, but she runs into the pilots who have been turned into updated versions of Prime Sentinels and they repel her. Dust frantically runs to Cyclops as infantry arrives in the form of Iceman and X-23. They manage to severely damage the human-Sentinel hybrids.

When the New X-Men are home alone with Beast, she, Mercury, and Rockslide go to put flowers on the graves of their deceased friends only to find Predator X eating the corpses. The three New X-Men battle with Predator X until Surge arrives, taking the beast on by herself, as the other three warn the others. After an intense battle across the remains of the school, Pixie teleports Predator X, herself, Dust, and the rest to the X-Men's final battle against the Marauders on Muir Island.

On Muir Island, Dust is crucial in the success of the battle against the Marauders. She helps take out the massively powerful and dangerous Exodus, by entering his body in her sand form and lacerating his lungs while he was distracted by Emma Frost.

Secret Invasion
Dust is among the several X-Men helping to fight off Skrulls during their invasion of San Francisco. She teams with Pixie and used her sandform alongside Pixie's teleportation to strategically provide cloud cover and evacuation for various other X-Men engaging in battle. She also pairs with Mercury, Pixie and the members of X-Force in a decoy attempt at capturing a Skrull.

Young X-Men

Sometime after Cyclops disbanded the institute, Sooraya had returned to Afghanistan. Sooraya is seen driving a group of militant guerillas from a small town and declaring the town to be under her protection, with the guerilla thinking she is some sort of extension of Allah's wrath. Shortly afterwards, Cyclops appears, asking her to return to New York to join his new team of Young X-Men.

Unaware that "Cyclops" was actually Donald Pierce in disguise, the Young X-Men proceed with their first mission to take down a new Brotherhood of Mutants supposedly composed of the original New Mutants. In the ensuing battle against Magma, a blast of flame turns Dust's sand form into glass. Sooraya's glass form is later shattered into hundreds of glass fragments in a battle between Donald Pierce and Graymalkin. However, Magma used her powers to return the glass back into sand and Sooraya is able to revert to human form. Realizing that they were used by Pierce, the Young X-Men and former New Mutants defeat Pierce, albeit with the death of Wolf Cub, and Sooraya joins the real X-Men in San Francisco.

During a conversation with the now-incarcerated Pierce, Sooraya revealed to him that she is dying.  It is later revealed during a confrontation with the Y-Men that part of her arm appears to still be locked in glass form. Her condition is worsening, as more of her body turns to glass. Beast conducts tests and confirms her prognosis, giving her less than a week to live. She demands that this be kept a secret, despite Beast's offer to find a way to save her. She later has a final conversation with Donald Pierce who offers to save her in return for his release, stating that he has since grown to appreciate Sooraya and their conversations. However, when the X-Men try to stop them, during the confrontation Dust is found by Danielle Moonstar, dead. Her body is then prepared for burial, though Ink intends to use his untested Phoenix Force tattoo to revive her. It succeeds, and Dust is revived, though the strain leaves Ink catatonic. Dust happily rejoins her teammates and her revival convinces the Young X-Men not to disband.

Necrosha
Dust is seen with Emma and Mercury, and then is shown fighting Wither. When Onyxx is killed by Kevin, she is shown mourning him.

Second Coming
Dust is seen as part of the second team defending the Golden Gate Bridge from Nimrod Sentinels from the future. She along with Magma, Rockslide, Namor and Colossus attempt to hold the Nimrod position and prevent them from reaching Utopia.

Curse of the Mutants
Due to her silicon based sand form during the Curse of the Mutants storyline, Dust is assigned to a "Tough Skin" team of X-Men to defend Utopia against a vampire invasion force.

Post-Schism
Initial solicits for the post-Schism X-Men split showed Dust siding with the majority of younger X-Men and moving to Westchester as part of Wolverine's team. She was seen on the blackbird ready to leave, and was seen walking away on the side of Wolverine in the ‘cave-man metaphor’ sequence in the X-Men Regenesis one-shot. However, as of the release of Wolverine & the X-Men #1 Dust is nowhere to be seen and does not appear on the roster. With the release of The Uncanny X-Men vol. 2 #1, Dust is shown still residing in Utopia and a part of the San Francisco street team under Dazzler. Dust is also seen among her fellow students in a class session in X-Men Legacy 260.1. Dust appears again as part of the Recruits in X-Men Legacy #262 on Cyclops' team, who came to aid Wolverine's Team against Exodus (Bennet du Paris), alongside Surge and Generation Hope. It is explained in X-Men: Legacy #263 that Dust originally went to Westchester, but changed her mind and returned to Utopia before the events of The Uncanny X-Men #1 vol. 2.

Outlawed
Upon learning many pre-adult superheroes have been falsely outlawed by the crusade of Senator Geoffrey Patrick and C.R.A.D.L.E., similar to what happened to mutants back in the 1990s, Dust and Cyclops rushes to help the surviving Champions and clear Kamala's name from being used for an unjust law, until Viv Vision and Brawn discovers Roxxon had been orchestrated the event behind Senator Patrick's back and reveals the footages behind the shady law to the public, including the senator. Thus, the government revoke the law and dissolve their partnership with Roxxon, which completely occur in the conclusion of Killer-App.

Appearance
In line with Sooraya's character as a traditional Muslim, she chooses to don a loose-fitting black dress, with a niqab covering her face. Sooraya explains to her mother that she dresses this way because of the modesty it affords her from men, and never did it because of the Taliban's enforcement of hijab on women. Her mother is happy that she lives somewhere where she is able to make those choices, unlike in Afghanistan. Characters in the comics often refer to Dust's traditional Muslim outfit as a burqa. However, the outfit Dust wears is an abaya with a niqab for her face, an ensemble originating in and worn mostly by Muslim women in the Persian Gulf states of the Middle East. In New X-Men vol. 2 #42, Gentle is the first to get it right while correcting fellow student Pixie.

Powers and abilities
 
Dust is a transmorph, able to transform herself into an explosive cloud of sand-like silicon particles and maintain control of her sand form. She can reform her normal body at will or maintain an aerial based sand form in the shape of her human body. Her sandstorm form is resistant to most forms of injury. The form makes her hard to detect telepathically, according to Jean Grey and Professor X. She is also resistant to magic. She can use the form to attack, for instance, scouring the flesh from her enemies' bones like a sandstorm as well as enter people's lungs and scouring them from the inside.

Reception

Critical reception 
Peter Eckhardt of CBR.com called Dust one of the "favorite characters with connections to the 616 AAPI community," writing, "Qadir's Sunni Muslim faith is a critical part of her character. She's depicted almost exclusively wearing traditional Muslim dress consisting of a niqab atop an abaya. Although her faith occasionally creates conflict with other characters, Qadir's faith remains strong and makes her one of the most positive representations of Muslim women in speculative fiction." Marc Buxton of Den of Geek said, "We have the devout Muslim warrior Dust, one of the bravest X-Men to join Xavier’s team in the 21st century. When a slave trader forcibly tried to remove her niqab, Sooraya Qadir manifested her power to turn her body into sand and flayed him alive. Dust remains one of X-Men’s bravest, using her unwavering faith and powers to help other young mutants. For Dust, her eyes tell the whole story, of faith and pain, of belief and bravery."

Accolades 

 In 2014, BuzzFeed ranked Dust 81st in their "95 X-Men Members Ranked From Worst To Best" list.
 In 2017, CBR.com ranked Dust 11th in their "15 Muslim Characters In Comics You Should Know" list.
 In 2017, Den of Geek included Dust in their "40 X-Men Characters Who Haven’t Appeared in the Movies But Should" list.
 In 2020, CBR.com ranked Dust 7th in their "10 Most Powerful Members Of The Hellions" list.
 In 2020, WhatCulture ranked Dust 7th in their "Marvel Phase 4: 10 Mutants Who Should Be MCU X-Men" list.
 In 2021, Screen Rant included Dust in their "10 Most Powerful Members Of The Champions" list.
 In 2022, CBR.com ranked Dust 2nd in their "10 Best X-Men Mutants Who Haven't Been In A Movie Yet" list and 6th in their "X-Men: 10 Heroes Who'd Be Perfect Assassins" list.

Other versions
Although Dust is a character in the main Marvel Universe continuity (also called "Earth-616,"), she has also been depicted in other fictional universes and alternate futures.

House of M
Sooraya appears as a member of the New Mutants in the House of M continuity. She appears to have formed a very close friendship with Jubilee and become Westernized, wearing revealing clothes and enjoying stereotypical 'mall rat' activities. Like the rest of the Hellions and New Mutants, she travels to Japan to fight against Emperor Sunfire in order to close down Project Genesis.

X-Men: The End
In the alternate time line depicted in X-Men: The End, Sooraya remains at the institute as the caretaker of Cyclops and Emma Frost's children. During the attack on the institute, Sooraya encounters Madelyne Pryor, asking if she is Jean Grey returning to the school. Madelyne lashes out and Sooraya defends herself, seemingly defeating Madelyne and escaping the institute before it explodes. It is later revealed that the "Dust" who escaped the encounter was really Madelyne, disguised in Sooraya's abaya. Upon revealing her true identity, Cyclops states that he already knew it was her and that the real Sooraya died back at the school.

Young X-Men "End of Days"
In a dystopic future depicted in the final two issues of "Young X-Men", Sooraya appears before the last remaining mutants on the once mutant safe-haven and independent state of "Xaviera". She easily kills Wolverine and kills Graymalkin and Emma Frost.  Before killing him, Sooraya explains to Anole that she is doing this because mutants are a "plague" upon the world and that she has become its cure, "a storm that wipes clean the earth". She reaches a now decrepit Ink, who has a brief conversation with her regarding her revival in the past.  They both discuss that his actions corrupted her, "killing" her soul and she reveals that she still harbors resentment over "mutants" allowing her to die in the first place. She states that she is sorry, as she knows his actions were good at heart, and kills him.

In this future depiction, Sooraya no longer observes Islamic hijab, wearing a tight outfit exposing her face and her cleavage. Her eyes glow red and she has combustive powers in addition to her original abilities.

In other media

Television

 Dust first appears in the Wolverine and the X-Men, voiced by Tara Strong. She first appears in the episode "Hindsight" Pt. 1, where she is a captive of the Mutant Response Division. She and others are freed by Wolverine and Dust uses her mutant abilities to take out some MRD jets. Dust also appears in "Greetings from Genosha" where she informs Nightcrawler about Magneto's underground cells. Later on, she ends up in Magneto's underground cells as a prisoner.

Video games

 Dust makes a brief cameo in Deadpool'''s ending in Marvel vs. Capcom 3: Fate of Two Worlds.

Novels

 In the X-Men: The Last Stand'' novel by Chris Claremont, Sooraya is mentioned by Rogue.

See also

 Kamala Khan

References

External links
 Dust at Marvel.com

Comics characters introduced in 2002
Characters created by Grant Morrison
Muslim characters in comics
Marvel Comics characters who are shapeshifters
Fictional characters with earth or stone abilities
Marvel Comics female superheroes
Marvel Comics mutants
Fictional Afghan people
Characters created by Ethan Van Sciver
Muslim superheroes